Hypotype is a genus of moths of the family Noctuidae.

Other meaning 
In taxonomy a hypotype is a specimen that was not part of the original type series of the species, but is known from a published description, figure, or listing.

References

Cuculliinae